Ardit Toli (born 12 July 1997) is a professional footballer who plays as a defender for Georgian side Torpedo Kutaisi. Born in Greece, he represents the Albania national team.

Club career

Early career
Toli started his youth career at Olympiacos Youth Academy.

On 11 August 2017 he was loaned out to Football League team AO Chania Kissamikos until 30 June 2018. He made his first professional debut for AO Chania Kissamikos on 21 September 2017 in the 2017–18 Greek Cup Group stage match against Acharnaikos playing the full 90-minutes match to help his team to win 1–0.

In January 2023 he moved to Torpedo Kutaisi.

Honours

Club 
Tirana
Kategoria Superiore: 2021–22

Club

References

External links
 Ardit Toli profile at FSHF.org

1997 births
Living people
Footballers from Piraeus
Greek people of Albanian descent
Association football defenders
Albanian footballers
Albania youth international footballers
Albania under-21 international footballers
Albania international footballers
Olympiacos F.C. players
AO Chania F.C. players
Kalamata F.C. players
KF Tirana players
FC Vorskla Poltava players
Ukrainian Premier League players
Albanian expatriate footballers
Expatriate footballers in Ukraine
Albanian expatriate sportspeople in Ukraine
Expatriate footballers in Georgia (country)
Albanian expatriate sportspeople in Georgia (country)